The Great Chinese Famine was a famine that ocurred between 1959 and 1961 in the People's Republic of China (PRC). Some scholars have also included the years 1958 or 1962. It is widely regarded as the deadliest famine and one of the greatest man-made disasters in human history, with an estimated death toll due to starvation that ranges in the tens of millions (15 to 55 million). The most stricken provinces were Anhui (18% dead), Chongqing (15%), Sichuan (13%), Guizhou (11%) and Hunan (8%).

The major contributing factors in the famine were the policies of the Great Leap Forward (1958 to 1962) and people's communes, launched by Chairman of the Chinese Communist Party Mao Zedong, such as inefficient distribution of food within the nation's planned economy; requiring the use of poor agricultural techniques; the Four Pests campaign that reduced sparrow populations (which disrupted the ecosystem); over-reporting of grain production; and ordering millions of farmers to switch to iron and steel production. During the Seven Thousand Cadres Conference in early 1962, Liu Shaoqi, then President of China, formally attributed 30% of the famine to natural disasters and 70% to man-made errors ("三分天灾, 七分人祸"). After the launch of Reforms and Opening Up, the Chinese Communist Party (CCP) officially stated in June 1981 that the famine was mainly due to the mistakes of the Great Leap Forward as well as the Anti-Rightist Campaign, in addition to some natural disasters and the Sino-Soviet split.

Terminology 
Besides the name "Three Years of Great Famine", the famine has been known by many names.

The government of China called it:

 Before June 1981: "Three Years of Natural Disasters".
 After June 1981: "Three Years of Difficulty".

Extent of the famine

Production drop 
Policy changes affecting how farming was organized coincided with droughts and floods. As a result, year-over-year grain production fell dramatically in China. The harvest was down by 15% in 1959 compared to 1958, and by 1960, it was at 70% of its 1958 level. Specifically, according to China's governmental data, crop production decreased from 200 million tons (or 400 billion jin) in 1958 to 170 million tons (or 340 billion jin) in 1959, and to 143.5 million tons (or 287 billion jin) in 1960.

Death toll 
The excess mortality associated with the famine has been estimated by former CCP officials and international experts, with most giving a number in the range of 15–55 million deaths. Historian Mobo Gao claims that anti-Communist writers prefer to stretch the death toll number as high as possible while those sympathetic to the Chinese Revolution prefer to see the number as low as possible. Some specific estimates include the following (ranging from lowest to highest):

 In 2021, Yang Songlin (杨松林), researcher at the Development Research Center of the State Council in Henan, estimated that roughly 2.6–4 million people died during the famine years.

 In 2016, Sun Jingxian (孙经先), scholar in applied mathematics and professor at Shandong University, concluded an estimate of 3.66 million "anomalous deaths" during the famine years.

 In 2007, Utsa Patnaik, a Marxian economist, estimated that 11 million deaths were caused due to the famine.

 In 2007, Daniel Houser, Barbara Sands, and Erte Xiao, writing in the Journal of Economic Behavior & Organization, estimated that China suffered 15.4 million excess deaths during the famine, of which 69% (or 10.6 million) were attributable to effects stemming from national policies.

 In 1989, a research team of the Chinese Academy of Sciences concluded that at least 15 million people died of malnutrition.

 In 1999, Shujie Yao (姚书杰), chair of economics at the Business School of Middlesex University, concluded that 18 million people perished due to the famine.

 In 1998, Li Chengrui (李成瑞), former Minister of the National Bureau of Statistics of China, estimated 22 million deaths. His estimate was based on the 27 million deaths estimated by Ansley J. Coale, and the 17 million deaths estimated by Jiang Zhenghua (蒋正华).

 In 1987, Peng Xizhe (彭希哲), Professor of Population and Development at Fudan University, estimated 23 million excess deaths during the famine.

 In 1987, Judith Banister, Director of Global Demographics at the Conference Board, estimated 30 million excess deaths from 1958 to 1961.

 In 1996, Jasper Becker, a British journalist and author of Hungry Ghosts: Mao's Secret Famine, wrote that most estimates of the famine death toll range from 30 to 60 million.

 In 2005, Cao Shuji (曹树基), Distinguished Professor at Shanghai Jiao Tong University, estimated the death toll at 32.5 million.

 In 2012, Yang Jisheng, Xinhua News Agency senior journalist and author of Tombstone: The Great Chinese Famine, 1958-1962, concluded there were 36 million deaths due to starvation, while another 40 million others failed to be born, so that "China's total population loss during the Great Famine then comes to 76 million." In response, historian Cormac Ó Gráda wrote that the results of a retrospective fertility survey "make the case for a total [death toll] much lower - perhaps ten million lower - than that proposed by Yang".

 In 2014, Mao Yushi, a Chinese economist and winner of the 2012 Milton Friedman Prize for Advancing Liberty, put the death toll at 36 million.

 In 2019, Liao Gailong (廖盖隆), former Vice Director of the History Research Unit of the CCP, reported 40 million "unnatural" deaths due to the famine.

 In 1994, Chen Yizi (陈一谘), a former senior Chinese official and a top advisor to former CCP General Secretary Zhao Ziyang, stated that 43 million people died due to the famine. Economist Carl Riskin wrote that "Chen Yizi's methods of estimation are unknown" because they are unpublished.

 In 2010, Frank Dikötter, Chair Professor of Humanities at the University of Hong Kong and the author of Mao's Great Famine, estimated that at least 45 million people died from starvation, overwork and state violence during the Great Leap Forward, claiming his findings to be based on access to recently opened local and provincial party archives. His study also stressed that state violence exacerbated the death toll. Dikötter claimed that at least 2.5 million of the victims were beaten or tortured to death. His approach to the documents, as well as his claim to be the first author to use them, however, have been questioned by some other scholars. Reviewing Mao's Great Famine, historian Cormac Ó Gráda wrote that "MGF is full of numbers but there are few tables and no graphs. [....] On page after page of MGF, numbers [...] are produced with no discussion of their reliability or provenance: all that seems to matter is that they are 'big'." Dikötter provides a graphic example of what happened to a family after one member was caught stealing some food:

 In 2015, Yu Xiguang (余习广), an independent Chinese historian and a former instructor at the Central Party School of the Chinese Communist Party, estimated that 55 million people died due to the famine. His conclusion was based on two decades of archival research.

Due to the lack of food and incentive to marry at that time, according to China's official statistics, China's population in 1961 was about 658,590,000, some 14,580,000 lower than in 1959. The birth rate decreased from 2.922% (1958) to 2.086% (1960) and the death rate increased from 1.198% (1958) to 2.543% (1960), while the average numbers for 1962–1965 are about 4% and 1%, respectively. The mortality in the birth and death rates both peaked in 1961 and began recovering rapidly after that, as shown on the chart of census data displayed here. Lu Baoguo, a Xinhua reporter based in Xinyang, explained to Yang Jisheng why he never reported on his experience:

Yu Dehong, the secretary of a party official in Xinyang in 1959 and 1960, stated:

Cannibalism 
There are widespread oral reports, though no official documentation, of human cannibalism being practiced in various forms as a result of the famine. To survive, people had to resort to every possible means, from eating soil and poisons to stealing and killing and even to eating human flesh. Due to the scale of the famine, some have speculated that the resulting cannibalism could be described as "on a scale unprecedented in the history of the 20th century".

Causes of the famine
The Great Chinese Famine was caused by a combination of radical agricultural policies, social pressure, economic mismanagement, and natural disasters such as droughts and floods in farming regions.

Great Leap Forward 

The Chinese Communist Party introduced drastic changes in farming policy during the Great Leap Forward.

People's communes 

During the Great Leap Forward, farming was organized into people's communes and the cultivation of individual plots was forbidden. Previously farmers cultivated plots of land given to them by the government. The Great Leap Forward led to the agricultural economy being increasingly centrally planned. Regional Party leaders were given production quotas for the communes under their control. Their output was then appropriated by the state and distributed at its discretion. In 2008, former deputy editor of Yanhuang Chunqiu and author Yang Jisheng would summarize his perspective of the effect of the production targets as an inability for supply to be redirected to where it was most demanded:

The degree to which people's communes lessened or worsened the famine is controversial. Each region dealt with the famine differently, and timelines of the famine are not uniform across China. One argument is that excessive eating took place in the mess halls, and that this directly led to a worsening of the famine. If excessive eating had not taken place, one scholar argued, "the worst of the Great Leap Famine could still have been avoided in mid-1959". However, dire hunger did not set in to places like Da Fo village until 1960, and the public dining hall participation rate was found not to be a meaningful cause of famine in Anhui and Jiangxi. In Da Fo village, "food output did not decline in reality, but there was an astonishing loss of food availability associated with Maoist state appropriation".

Agricultural techniques 
Along with collectivization, the central government decreed several changes in agricultural techniques that would be based on the ideas of later-discredited Russian agronomist Trofim Lysenko. One of these ideas was close planting, whereby the density of seedlings was at first tripled and then doubled again. The theory was that plants of the same species would not compete with each other. In natural cycles they did fully compete, which actually stunted growth and resulted in lower yields.

Another policy known as "deep plowing" was based on the ideas of Lysenko's colleague Terentiy Maltsev, who encouraged peasants across China to eschew normal plowing depths of 15–20 centimeters and instead plow deeply into the soil (1 to 2 Chinese feet or 33 to 66 cm). The deep plowing theory stated that the most fertile soil was deep in the earth, and plowing unusually deeply would allow extra-strong root growth. While deep plowing can increase yields in some contexts, the policy is generally considered to have hindered yields in China.

Four Pests campaign 

In the Four Pests campaign, citizens were called upon to destroy mosquitoes, rats, flies, and sparrows. The mass eradication of the sparrows resulted in an increase of the population of crop-eating insects, which had no predators without the sparrows.

Illusion of superabundance 
Beginning in 1957, the Chinese Communist Party began to report excessive production of grain because of pressure from superiors. However, the actual production of grain throughout China was decreasing from 1957 to 1961. For example:

 In Sichuan Province, even though the collected grain was decreasing from 1958 to 1961, the numbers reported to the central government kept increasing.
 In Gansu, the grain yield declined by 4,273,000 tonnes from 1957 to 1961.

This series of events resulted in an "illusion of superabundance" (浮夸风), and the Party believed that they had an excess of grain. On the contrary, the crop yields were lower than average. For instance, Beijing believed that "in 1960 state granaries would have 50 billion jin of grain", when they actually contained 12.7 billion jin. The effects of the illusion of superabundance were significant, leaving some historians to argue that it was the major cause of much of the starvation throughout China. Yang Dali argued that there were three main consequences from the illusion of superabundance:

Iron and steel production 

Iron and steel production was identified as a key requirement for economic advancement, and millions of peasants were ordered away from agricultural work to join the iron and steel production workforce. Much of the iron produced by the peasant population ended up being too weak to be used commercially.

More policies from the central government 
Economists Xin Meng, Nancy Qian and Pierre Yared showed that, much as Nobel laureate Amartya Sen had earlier claimed, aggregate production was sufficient for avoiding famine and that the famine was caused by over-procurement and poor distribution within the country. They show that unlike most other famines, there were surprisingly more deaths in places that produced more food per capita, explaining that the inflexibility in the centrally planned food procurement system explains at least half of the famine mortality. Economic historians James Kung and Shuo Chen show that there was more over-procurement in places where politicians faced more competition.

In addition, policies from the Chinese Communist Party (CCP) and the central government, particularly the Three Red Banners and the Socialist Education Movement (SEM), proved to be ideologically detrimental to the worsening famine. The Three Red Banners of the CCP "sparked the fanaticism of 1958". The implementation of the Mass line, one of the three banners which told people to "go all out, aim high, and build socialism with greater, better, and more economical results", is cited in connection to the pressures officials felt to report a superabundance of grain. The SEM, established in 1957, also led to the severity of the famine in various ways, including causing the "illusion of superabundance" (浮夸风). Once the exaggerations of crop yields from the Mass Line were reported, "no one dared to 'dash cold water on further reports. The SEM also led to the establishment of conspiracy theories in which the peasants were believed to be pretending to be hungry in order to sabotage the state grain purchase.

Power relations in local governments 

Local governments had just as much, if not more, influence on the famine than did higher rungs of government. As the Great Leap Forward progressed, many provincial leaders began aligning themselves with Mao and higher Party leaders. Local leaders were forced to choose between doing what was best for their community and guarding their reputation politically. Landlords began "denouncing any opposition as 'conservative rightism, which is defined broadly as anything anti-communist. In an environment of conspiracy theories directed against peasants, saving extra grain for a family to eat, espousing the belief that the Great Leap Forward should not be implemented, or merely not working hard enough were all seen as forms of "conservative rightism". Peasants became unable to speak openly on collectivization and state grain purchase. With a culture of fear and recrimination at both a local and official level, speaking and acting against the famine became a seemingly impossible task.

The influence of local government in the famine can be seen in the comparison between the provinces of Anhui and Jiangxi. Anhui, having a radical pro-Mao government, was led by Zeng Xisheng who was "dictatorial", with ties to Mao. Zeng firmly believed in the Great Leap Forward and tried to build relationships with higher officials rather than maintain local ties. Zeng proposed agricultural projects without consulting colleagues, which caused Anhui's agriculture to fail terribly. Zhang Kaifan, a party secretary and deputy-governor of the province, heard rumours of a famine breaking out in Anhui and disagreed with many of Zeng's policies. Zeng reported Zhang to Mao for such speculations. As a result, Mao labeled Zhang "a member of the 'Peng Dehuai anti-Party military clique and he was purged from the local party. Zeng was unable to report on the famine when it became an emergency situation, as this would prove his hypocrisy. For this he was described as a "blatant political radical who almost single-handedly damaged Anhui".

Jiangxi encountered a situation almost opposite to that of Anhui. The leaders of Jiangxi publicly opposed some of the Great Leap programs, quietly made themselves unavailable, and even appeared to take a passive attitude towards the Maoist economy. As the leaders worked collaboratively among themselves, they also worked with the local population. By creating an environment in which the Great Leap Forward did not become fully implemented, the Jiangxi government "did their best to minimize damage". From these findings, scholars Manning and Wemheuer concluded that much of the severity of the famine was due to provincial leaders and their responsibility for their regions.

Natural disasters 

In 1958, there was a notable regional flood of the Yellow River which affected part of Henan Province and Shandong Province. It was reported as the most severe flood of the Yellow River since 1933. In July 1958, the Yellow River flood affected 741,000 people in 1708 villages and inundated over 3.04 million mu (over half a million acres) of cultivated fields. The largest torrent of the flood was smoothly directed into the Bohai Sea on 27 July, and the government declared a "victory over the flood" after sending a rescue team of over 2 million people. The spokesperson of the Flood Prevention Center of Chinese government stated on 27 July 1958, that:

But the government was encouraged to report success and hide failures. Because the 2 million farm laborers from the two provinces were ordered away from the fields to serve as a rescue team and were repairing the banks of the river instead of tending to their fields, "crops are neglected and much of the harvest is left to rot in the fields". On the other hand, historian Frank Dikötter has argued that most floods during the famine were not due to unusual weather, but to massive, poorly planned and poorly executed irrigation works which were part of the Great Leap Forward. At this time, encouraged by Mao Zedong, people in China were building a large number of dams and thousands of kilometers of new irrigation canals in an attempt to move water from wet areas to areas that were experiencing drought. Some of the works, such as the Red Flag Canal, made positive contributions to irrigation, but researchers have pointed out that the massive hydraulic construction project led to many deaths due to starvation, epidemics, and drowning, which contributed to the famine.

However, there have been disagreements on the significance of the drought and floods in causing the Great Famine. According to published data from Chinese Academy of Meteorological Sciences, the drought in 1960 was not uncommon and its severity was only considered "mild" compared to that in other years—it was less serious than those in 1955, 1963, 1965–1967, and so on. Moreover, Yang Jisheng, who was a senior journalist from Xinhua News Agency, reports that Xue Muqiao, then head of the National Statistics Bureau of China, said in 1958, "We give whatever figures the upper-level wants" to overstate natural disasters and relieve official responsibility for deaths due to starvation. Yang claimed that he investigated other sources including a non-government archive of meteorological data from 350 weather stations across China, and the droughts, floods, and temperatures during 1958–1961 were within the typical patterns for China. According to Basil Ashton:

Despite these claims, other scholars have provided provincial-level demographic panel data which quantitatively proved that weather was also an important factor, particularly in those provinces which experienced excessively wet conditions. According to economist Daniel Houser and others, 69% of the Famine was due to government policies while the rest (31%) was due to natural disasters.

Aftermath

Initial reactions and cover-ups 

Local party leaders, for their part, conspired to cover up shortfalls and reassign blame in order to protect their own lives and positions. Mao was kept unaware of some of the starvation of villagers in the rural areas who were suffering, as the birth rate began to plummet and deaths increased in 1958 and 1959. In 1960, as gestures of solidarity, Mao ate no meat for seven months and Zhou Enlai cut his monthly grain consumption.

In visits to Henan province in 1958, Mao observed what local officials claimed was increases in crop yield of one thousand to three thousand percent achieved, supposedly, in massive 24-hour pushes organized by the officials which they called "sputnik launches".  But the numbers were faked, and so were the fields that Mao observed, which had been carefully prepared in advance of Mao's visit by local officials, who removed shoots of grain from various fields and carefully transplanted them into a field prepared especially for Mao, which appeared to be a bumper crop.

The local officials became trapped by these sham demonstrations to Mao, and exhorted the peasants to reach unattainable goals, by "deep ploughing and close planting", among other techniques. This ended up making things much worse; the crop failed completely, leaving barren fields. No one was in a position to challenge Mao's ideas as incorrect, so peasants went to extreme lengths to keep up the charade; some grew seedlings in their bedding and coats and, after the seedlings quickly sprouted, "planted" them in fields—the bedding made the plants look high and healthy.

Like in the massive Soviet-created famine in Ukraine (the Holodomor), doctors were prohibited from listing "starvation" as a cause of death on death certificates. This kind of deception was far from uncommon; a famous propaganda picture from the famine shows Chinese children from Shandong province ostensibly standing atop a field of wheat, so densely grown that it could apparently support their weight. In reality, they were standing on a bench concealed beneath the plants, and the "field" was again entirely composed of individually transplanted stalks.

Cultural Revolution 

In April and May 1961, Liu Shaoqi, then President of the People's Republic of China, concluded after 44 days of field research in villages of Hunan that the causes of the famine were 30% natural disaster and 70% human error (三分天灾, 七分人祸).

In January and February 1962, the "7000 Cadres Conference" took place in Beijing, which was attended by more than 7,000 CCP officials nationwide. During the conference, Liu formally announced his conclusion on the causes of the great famine, while the Great Leap Forward was declared "over" by the Chinese Communist Party. The policies of Mao Zedong were criticized.

The failure of the Great Leap Forward as well as the famine forced Mao Zedong to withdraw from active decision-making within the CCP and the central government, and turn various future responsibilities over to Liu Shaoqi and Deng Xiaoping. A series of economic reforms were carried out by Liu and Deng and others, including policies such as sanzi yibao (三自一包) which allowed free market and household responsibility for agricultural production.

However, the disagreement between Mao Zedong, Liu Shaoqi and Deng Xiaoping over economic and social policy  grew larger. In 1963, Mao launched the Socialist Education Movement and in 1966, he launched the Cultural Revolution, during which Liu was accused of being a traitor and enemy agent for attributing only 30% to natural calamities. Liu was beaten and denied medicine for diabetes and pneumonia; he died in 1969. On the other hand, Deng was accused of being a "capitalist roader" during the Cultural Revolution and was purged twice.

Reforms and reflections 

In December 1978, Deng Xiaoping became the new Paramount Leader of China and launched the historic Reforms and Opening Up program which fundamentally changed the agricultural and industrial system in China. Until the early 1980s, the Chinese government's stance, reflected by the name "Three Years of Natural Disasters", was that the famine was largely a result of a series of natural disasters compounded by several planning errors. During the "Boluan Fanzheng" period in June 1981, the Chinese Communist Party (CCP) officially changed the name to "Three Years of Difficulty", and stated that the famine was mainly due to the mistakes of the Great Leap Forward as well as the Anti-Rightist Campaign, in addition to some natural disasters and the Sino-Soviet split. Academic studies on the Great Chinese Famine also became more active in mainland China after 1980, when the government started to release some demographic data to the public. A number of high-ranking Chinese officials had expressed their views on the famine:

 Zhao Ziyang, former General Secretary of the Chinese Communist Party, once said that "our Party never admitted mistakes. If things got really bad, we just found some scapegoats and blamed them, like Lin Biao and the Gang of Four. If scapegoats were hard to find, we simply blamed natural disasters, such as for the great famine in the late 1950s and early 1960s when tens of millions of people died, which was simply due to political errors of the Party."
 Bo Yibo, one of the Eight Elders and former Vice Premier of the People's Republic of China, once said, "During the three difficult years, people across the country went into malnutrition due to lack of food, and edema was prevalent, resulting in an increasing number of deaths due to starvation among many rural areas. It is estimated that in 1960 alone, more than 10 million people died. With such thing happening during a time of peace, we as members of the Communist Party feel truly guilty in front of the people, and we must never forget this heavy lesson! "
 Wan Li, former President of the National People's Congress of China, stated that "during the three difficult years after the People's Commune movement, people everywhere had edema and even starved to death. In Anhui alone, according to reports, there were 3-4 million people died 'abnormally' ...... We had been ' left ' for too long, and farmers were no longer motivated to work."
Tian Jiyun, former Vice Premier of China and former Vice President of the National People's Congress of China, stated that "looking back at the Three Years of Difficulty, people everywhere had edema and died of starvation, and tens of millions of people died abnormally, more than the total death toll during the entire Democratic Revolution. What was the reason for that? Liu Shaoqi said it was '30% natural disasters and 70% human error.' But it is now clear that the famine was mainly due to human error, which was the erroneous command, the  'Utopian Socialism', and the 'Left opportunism'."

Researchers outside China have argued that the massive institutional and policy changes which accompanied the Great Leap Forward were the key factors in the famine, or at least worsened nature-induced disasters. In particular, Nobel laureate Amartya Sen puts this famine in a global context, arguing that lack of democracy is the major culprit: "Indeed, no substantial famine has ever occurred in a democratic country—no matter how poor." He adds that it is "hard to imagine that anything like this could have happened in a country that goes to the polls regularly and that has an independent press. During that terrible calamity the government faced no pressure from newspapers, which were controlled, and none from opposition parties, which were absent." Sen estimated: "Despite the gigantic size of excess mortality in the Chinese famine, the extra mortality in India from regular deprivation in normal times vastly overshadows the former. [...] India seems to manage to fill its cupboard with more skeletons every eight years than China put there in its years of shame."

See also
 List of famines in China
 Northern Chinese Famine of 1876–1879
 Chinese famine of 1906–1907
 Chinese famine of 1928–1930
 Chinese famine of 1942–1943
 Four Pests campaign
 Droughts and famines in Russia and the Soviet Union
 Russian famine of 1921–1922
 Soviet famine of 1930–1933
 Holodomor
 Soviet famine of 1946–1947
 Hungry Ghosts: Mao's Secret Famine
 Mao's Great Famine
 70,000 Character Petition
 List of famines
 Crimes against humanity under communist regimes
 Criticism of communist party rule
 Mass killings under communist regimes
1975 Banqiao Dam failure
 Khmer Rouge
 1983–1985 famine in Ethiopia
 North Korean famine

Notes

References

Further reading 

 Ashton, Basil, Kenneth Hill, Alan Piazza, Robin Zeitz, "Famine in China, 1958–61", Population and Development Review, Vol. 10, No. 4. (Dec. 1984), pp. 613–645.
 Banister, J. "Analysis of Recent Data on the Population of China", Population and Development, Vol. 10, No. 2, 1984.
 
 
 Cao Shuji, "The Deaths of China's Population and Its Contributing Factors during 1959–1961". China's Population Science (Jan. 2005) (In Chinese).
 China Statistical Yearbook (1984), edited by State Statistical Bureau. China Statistical Publishing House, 1984. pp. 83, 141, 190.
 China Statistical Yearbook (1991), edited by State Statistical Bureau. China Statistical Publishing House, 1991.
 China Population Statistical Yearbook (1985), edited by State Statistical Bureau. China Statistical Bureau Publishing House, 1985.
 Coale, Ansley J., Rapid Population Change in China, 1952–1982, National Academy Press, Washington, D.C., 1984.
 Dikötter, Frank. Mao's Great Famine: The History of China's Most Devastating Catastrophe, 1958–62. Walker & Company, 2010. .
 Gao. Mobo (2007). Gao Village: Rural Life in Modern China. University of Hawaii Press. .
 Gao. Mobo (2008). The Battle for China's Past. Pluto Press. .
 Jiang Zhenghua,  "Method and Result of China Population Dynamic Estimation", Academic Report of Xi'a University, 1986(3). pp. 46, 84.
 Li Chengrui(): Population Change Caused by The Great Leap Movement, Demographic Study, No.1, 1998 pp. 97–111
 Li. Minqi (2008). The Rise of China and the Demise of the Capitalist World Economy. Monthly Review Press. 
 Peng Xizhe, "Demographic Consequences of the Great Leap Forward in China's Provinces", Population and Development Review, Vol. 13, No. 4. (Dec. 1987), pp. 639–670
 Thaxton. Ralph A. Jr (2008). Catastrophe and Contention in Rural China: Mao's Great Leap Forward Famine and the Origins of Righteous Resistance in Da Fo Village. Cambridge University Press. 
 
 Yang, Dali. Calamity and Reform in China: State, Rural Society and Institutional Change since the Great Leap Famine. Stanford University Press, 1996.
 Yang Jisheng. Tombstone (Mu Bei – Zhong Guo Liu Shi Nian Dai Da Ji Huang Ji Shi). Cosmos Books (Tian Di Tu Shu), Hong Kong 2008.
 Yang Jisheng. "Tombstone: An Account of Chinese Famine in the 1960s" (墓碑 － 中國六十年代大饑荒紀實 (Mubei – Zhongguo Liushi Niandai Da Jihuang Jishi), Hong Kong: Cosmos Books (Tiandi Tushu), 2008,  . By 2010, it was appearing under the title: 墓碑: 一九五八-一九六二年中國大饑荒紀實 (Mubei: Yi Jiu Wu Ba – Yi Jiu Liu Er Nian Zhongguo Da Jihuang Shiji) ("Tombstone: An Account of Chinese Famine From 1958–1962").
 Yang Jisheng. Tombstone: The Untold Story of Mao's Great Famine, Yang Jisheng, Translators: Stacy Mosher, Guo Jian, Publisher: Allen Lane (30 October 2012),  (English translation of the above work)
 Translated into English and abridged. Yang Jisheng, Tombstone: The Great Chinese Famine, 1958–1962, Farrar, Straus and Giroux (30 October 2012), hardcover, 656 pp., 
 Official Chinese statistics, shown as a graph. 

1958 disasters in China
1958 in China
1959 disasters in China
1959 in China
1960 disasters in China
1960 in China
1961 disasters in China
1961 in China
1962 disasters in China
1962 in China
Famines in China
Incidents of cannibalism
Man-made disasters in China
20th-century famines
Great Leap Forward